20FIFI is the debut studio album of South African recording artist Fifi Cooper. It was released on 13 November 2015 under Ambitiouz Entertainment.

Track listing

Accolades

One single from 20Fifi has been certified gold. Kuze Kuse, which featured former label mate Emtee. The video of Kuze kuse reached 1 million views on YouTube making Fifi Cooper the first South African female rapper to achieve this. 20Fifi is currently the best selling female rap album in South Africa, the only female rap album to appear on iTunes top 200 hip hop albums of all time.

Awards and nominations 
20FIFI won two category awards at the 15th Metro FM Music Awards.

Release history

References

2015 debut albums
Fifi Cooper albums
Ambitiouz Entertainment albums
Albums produced by Tweezy